Whitaker is an unincorporated community in Ray Township, Morgan County, in the U.S. state of Indiana.

History
A post office was established at Whitaker in 1883, and remained in operation until it was discontinued in 1937.

Geography

References

Unincorporated communities in Morgan County, Indiana
Unincorporated communities in Indiana
Indianapolis metropolitan area